Ivan Daniels is an American former professional basketball player.

College
Daniels played four seasons of college basketball for University of Illinois at Chicago. He was a key member of the 1983–84 UIC team that won the Association of Mid-Continent Universities Conference regular season title and set a then-school record with 22 victories. During his senior year, Daniels averaged 17.7 points per game.

Playing career
After his college career, Daniels was drafted by the Indiana Pacers in the 5th round of the 1985 NBA Draft. He was cut by the Pacers before the start of the season and went on to play professionally with, among others, Tonego '65 in the Dutch Basketball League during the 1985–1986 season and the Newcastle Falcons of the Australian National Basketball League during the 1987 NBL season.

References

External links
 Profile at Basketball-Reference.com
 College statistics at Sports-Reference.com

Living people
Indiana Pacers players
Newcastle Falcons (basketball) players
UIC Flames men's basketball players
American men's basketball players
Centers (basketball)
1963 births